Lajos Virág (born June 27, 1977 in Eger) is an amateur Hungarian Greco-Roman wrestler, who played for the men's heavyweight category. He won the silver medal for his division at the 2005 World Wrestling Championships in Budapest, Hungary, losing out to Turkey's Hamza Yerlikaya.

Virag made his official debut at the 2004 Summer Olympics in Athens, where he placed second in the preliminary pool of the men's 96 kg class, against Cuba's Ernesto Peña and United States' Garrett Lowney.

At the 2008 Summer Olympics in Beijing, Virag lost the second preliminary match of the 96 kg class to another American wrestler Adam Wheeler, who eventually won the bronze medal in this event.

References

External links
FILA Profile
NBC Olympics Profile

Hungarian male sport wrestlers
1977 births
Living people
Olympic wrestlers of Hungary
Wrestlers at the 2004 Summer Olympics
Wrestlers at the 2008 Summer Olympics
Sportspeople from Eger
World Wrestling Championships medalists
21st-century Hungarian people